Hoffmannia regalis is a species of plant in the family Rubiaceae. It is endemic to Mexico.

Synonyms
 Campylobotrys regalis Linden
 Higginsia aggregata f. ortgiesii Regel
 Higginsia aggregata f. roezlii Regel
 Higginsia regalis Hook.
 Hoffmannia lineolata Donn.Sm.
 Hoffmannia riparia Standl.
 Ohigginsia refulgens f. ortgiesii Regel
 Ohigginsia refulgens f. roezlii Regel
 Ohigginsia refulgens f. smaragdina Regel

References
 Biol. Cent.-Amer., Bot. 2: 37 1881.
 The Plant List
 JSTOR

regalis